Anatoly Petrovich Sedykh (born April 20, 1963), known as The Lipetsk Chikatilo, is a Russian serial killer.

Biography 
Sedykh was born in 1963. He was married and had one child- Timur Sedykh, working as a driver.

Sedykh began to commit crimes in early 1998. His victims were women under the age of 28, whom he raped and murdered, stealing their valuables afterwards.

The case of the Lipetsk killer acquired great public resonance, and for his capture a reward of 100 thousand rubles and a car were promised. Sedykh was repeatedly detained by police officers, but due to lack of any evidence against him, he was released.

The last murder Sedykh committed was in 2003. He did not kill anybody after that, but continued to keep the victims' belongings in his garage. In 2008, a relative accidentally found a mobile phone from one of the victims and turned it on, which made it possible to trace his whereabouts. On June 4, 2008, Sedykh was detained, and the above-mentioned material evidence was found in the garage. In addition, there was a VAZ-2106, a car which had been seen by some of the witnesses. After two genetic examinations, Sedykh confessed to all the crimes.

On April 19, 2010, the Lipetsk Regional Court sentenced Sedykh to life imprisonment. The punishment was to be served in the "Black Berkut" colony in the Sverdlovsk Oblast. In September 2013, the media reported that the convict had committed suicide by hanging himself in a colony cell, but the regional UFSIN disproved this information the following day.

As of February 2018, Sedykh is still alive.

See also 
 Viktor Sotnikov
 Nikolay Shubin
 List of Russian serial killers
 List of serial killers by number of victims

References 

1963 births
Living people
Male serial killers
Russian rapists
Russian serial killers